Snohomish County is a county located in the U.S. state of Washington. With a population of 827,957 as of the 2020 census, it is the third-most populous county in Washington, after nearby King and Pierce counties, and the 75th-most populous in the United States. The county seat and largest city is Everett. The county forms part of the Seattle metropolitan area, which also includes King and Pierce counties to the south.

The county's western portion, facing Puget Sound and other inland waters of the Salish Sea, is home to the majority of its population and major cities. The eastern portion is rugged and includes portions of the Cascade Range, with few settlements along major rivers and most of it designated as part of Mount Baker–Snoqualmie National Forest. Snohomish County is bound to the north by Skagit County, to the east by Chelan County, to the south by King County, and to the west by Kitsap and Island counties.

Snohomish County was created out of Island County on January 14, 1861, and is named for the indigenous Snohomish people. It includes the Tulalip Indian Reservation, which was established by the 1855 Point Elliott Treaty, which relocated several indigenous Coast Salish groups to the reservation. The county seat was originally at the city of Snohomish until an 1897 election moved it to Everett. Since the mid-20th century, areas of Snohomish County have developed into an aerospace manufacturing center, largely due to the presence of Boeing in Everett, as well as bedroom communities for workers in Seattle.

Snohomish County now has 18 incorporated cities and 2 towns with their own local governments, in addition to developed unincorporated areas. It is connected to nearby areas by roads (including Interstate 5), railways, and transit systems. The county government is led by a five-member county council and chief executive elected by voters to four-year terms.

Etymology
"Snohomish" comes from the name of the largest Native American tribe in the area when settlers arrived in the 19th century. The name is spelled as "Sdoh-doh-hohbsh" in the Lushootseed language and has a disputed meaning with unclear origins. Indian agent Dr. Charles M. Buchanan, who spent 21 years with the Tulalips, once said that he had "never met an Indian who could give a meaning to the word Snohomish". Chief William Shelton, the last hereditary tribal chief of the Snohomish tribe, claimed that it meant "lowland people", a name associated with the tribe's location on the waters of the Puget Sound; other scholars have claimed "a style of union among them", "the braves", or "Sleeping Waters".

The name is also used for the Snohomish River, which runs through part of the county, and the City of Snohomish, the former county seat that was renamed after the formation of the county. The current spelling of the name was adopted by the Surveyor General of Washington Territory in 1857, with earlier documents and accounts using alternative spellings. John Work of the Hudson's Bay Company recorded the name "Sinnahmis" in 1824, while the Wilkes Expedition of 1841 used "Tuxpam" to describe the Snohomish River. The same river was named "Sinahomis" by Captain Henry Kellett in 1847, and was accepted by the U.S. government for several years.

History

Snohomish County was originally inhabited by several Coast Salish groups, predominantly settled along the western coastline and near the region's rivers. The Snohomish were the largest group and occupied an area from present-day Warm Beach to Shoreline, while Stillaguamish lived in the Stillaguamish River basin. The region was first charted and named by European explorers in the late 18th century, beginning with Captain George Vancouver and his British expedition. Vancouver arrived in Puget Sound and Port Gardner Bay on June 4, 1792, landing near present-day Everett.

The Treaty of Point Elliott was signed at present-day Mukilteo on January 22, 1855, marking the cession of Coast Salish territories in the Puget Sound lowlands. The Tulalip Indian Reservation was established to house the remaining tribes, including the Snohomish, Snoqualmie, and Skykomish. Snohomish County was created out of Island County on January 14, 1861.

The territorial legislature designated Mukilteo, the area's largest settlement, as the temporary county seat in January 1861. The county government was permanently moved to Cadyville, later Snohomish, in July of that year. After the incorporation of the city of Everett in 1893, the city's leaders attempted to move the county seat from Snohomish. A countywide general election on November 6, 1894, chose to relocate the county seat to Everett, amid controversy and allegations of illegal votes. After two years of litigation between the cities of Snohomish and Everett, the county seat was officially relocated to Everett in December 1896.

One of the first county censuses was taken in 1862 by Sheriff Salem A. Woods.

Early important pioneers in the Snohomish County region included E. F. Cady of Snohomish, E. C. Ferguson of Snohomish and Isaac Cathcart.

Geography

Snohomish County is part of the Puget Sound region of Western Washington, bordered to the south by King County, to the west by Puget Sound and other inland waters, to the north by Skagit County, and to the east by the Chelan County at the crest of the Cascade Range. It is the 13th largest county in Washington by land area and is larger than the states of Delaware and Rhode Island.

The county's surface is covered by plains and rolling hills in the west, where the majority of settlements are, and mountainous terrain in the east. The Cascade Range passes through the eastern part of the county and is largely protected from development as part of the Mount Baker–Snoqualmie National Forest. Several major rivers originate in the Cascades and flow west towards Puget Sound and other parts of the Salish Sea, including the Stillaguamish and Snohomish (fed by the Skykomish and Snoqualmie rivers). These rivers form several valleys used for agriculture that occasionally flood during major weather events, such as atmospheric rivers.

Climate

The lowland areas of western Snohomish County generally has a temperate Mediterranean climate similar to the rest of the central Puget Sound region with dry summers and wet winters. The county's weather is heavily influenced by maritime systems, pushed by prevailing westerly winds but dampened by the Olympic Mountains. The record highest temperatures were set during a June 2021 heat wave, with highs of up to  recorded in several areas. The Puget Sound Convergence Zone, a known meteorological phenomenon, runs through southwestern Snohomish County and causes narrow bands of precipitation.

Flora and fauna

Approximately 68 percent of land in Snohomish County is classified as forestland, which is predominantly located in the eastern portions. These forests are dominated by conifer species such as Douglas firs, hemlocks, and cedars, with pockets of deciduous species in logged areas.

Demographics

2020 census
As of the 2020 census, there were 827,957 people families residing in the county. The racial makeup of the county was 66.1% white, 12.3% Asian, 3.54% black or African American, 1.3% Native American, 0.6% Pacific Islander, 5.4% other races, and 10.8% from two or more races. Those of Hispanic or Latino origin made up 11.6% of the population.

2010 census
As of the 2010 census, there were 713,335 people, 268,325 households, and 182,282 families residing in the county. The racial makeup of the county was 78.4% white, 8.9% Asian, 2.5% black or African American, 1.4% Indigenous, 0.4% Pacific islander, 3.8% from other races, and 4.6% from two or more races. Those of Hispanic or Latino origin made up 9.0% of the population. In terms of ancestry, 20.3% were German, 12.6% were Irish, 12.2% were English, 8.2% were Norwegian, and 3.6% were American.

Of the 268,325 households, 35.2% had children under the age of 18 living with them, 52.4% were married couples living together, 10.4% had a female householder with no husband present, 32.1% were non-families, and 24.3% of all households were made up of individuals. The average household size was 2.62 and the average family size was 3.12. The median age was 37.1 years.

The median income for a household in the county was $66,300 and the median income for a family was $77,479. Males had a median income of $56,152 versus $41,621 for females. The per capita income for the county was $30,635. About 5.9% of families and 8.4% of the population were below the poverty line, including 10.8% of those under age 18 and 7.3% of those age 65 or over.

2000 census
As of the 2000 census, there were 606,024 people, 224,852 households, and 157,846 families residing in the county. The population density was 290 people per square mile (112/km2). There were 236,205 housing units at an average density of 113 per square mile (44/km2). The racial makeup of the county was 85.6% White, 1.7% Black or African American, 1.4% Native American, 5.8% Asian, 0.3% Pacific Islander, 1.9% from other races, and 3.4% from two or more races. 4.7% of the population were Hispanic or Latino of any race. 16.2% were of German, 10.0% English, 8.8% Irish, 8.4% Norwegian and 6.6% United States or American ancestry.

There were 224,852 households, out of which 37.3% had children under the age of 18 living with them, 56.0% were married couples living together, 9.8% had a female householder with no husband present, and 29.8% were non-families. 22.6% of all households were made up of individuals, and 6.5% had someone living alone who was 65 years of age or older. The average household size was 2.65 and the average family size was 3.13.

In the county, the population was spread out, with 27.4% under the age of 18, 8.5% from 18 to 24, 33.0% from 25 to 44, 22.0% from 45 to 64, and 9.1% who were 65 years of age or older. The median age was 35 years. For every 100 females, there were 100.1 males. For every 100 females age 18 and over, there were 98.2 males.

The median income for a household in the county was $53,060, and the median income for a family was $60,726. Males had a median income of $43,293 versus $31,386 for females. The per capita income for the county was $23,417. About 4.9% of families and 6.9% of the population were below the poverty line, including 7.6% of those under age 18 and 7.8% of those age 65 or over.

Law and government

County Executive
The county executive is Dave Somers, a Democrat. Somers is a former Snohomish County Councilmember and took office as county executive on January 4, 2016, having won the seat from incumbent and fellow Democrat John Lovick.

The county executive seat was chartered in the 1979. The first county executive was conservative Democrat Willis Tucker of Snohomish from 1980 to 1992. Following Tucker, the next county executive was Democrat Bob Drewel from 1992 to 2004, followed by Democrat Aaron Reardon from 2004 to 2013. Reardon resigned on May 31, 2013, amid a series of political scandals, and was replaced by former Snohomish County Sheriff and state legislator John Lovick for the remainder of his term.

County Council

The county council is made up of:
 Nate Nehring (R) – district 1
 Megan Dunn (D) – district 2
 Stephanie Wright (D) – district 3
 Jared Mead (D) – district 4
 Sam Low (R) – district 5

Politics
Snohomish County has been a reliably Democratic county in recent presidential elections (albeit to a lesser degree than neighboring King County and Seattle). It has voted Democratic all but four times since 1932, with those four occasions being national Republican landslides in which the GOP candidate won over 400 electoral votes. It has not voted for a Republican since George H. W. Bush in 1988.

Education

Snohomish County is one of the most-populous counties in the United States without a four-year, baccalaureate degree-granting institution.

Columbia College offers AA all the way up to a Master's in Business along with other Associate and bachelor's degrees. Everett Community College and Edmonds College provide academic transfer degrees, career training and basic education in Snohomish County. Together, the two serve more than 40,000 people annually. About 40 percent of all high school graduates in Snohomish County begin their college education at Edmonds or Everett community college.

Everett Community College is the legislatively appointed leader of the University Center of North Puget Sound, which offers 25 bachelor's and master's degrees through Western Washington University, Washington State University, Central Washington University, Eastern Washington University, The Evergreen State College, Hope International University, and the University of Washington Bothell.

Edmonds College and Central Washington University have worked together since 1975 to provide higher education in Snohomish County. After earning a two-year degree online or on campus from Edmonds College, students can continue their studies for a bachelor's degree from Central Washington University-Lynnwood in Snoqualmie Hall, a shared building on the Edmonds CC campus.

Media
Residents receive much of their information from Seattle-based media, the most prominent of which include The Seattle Times and regional TV news stations. The Herald in Everett is the county's most popular daily newspaper, while weekly newspapers such as the Snohomish County Tribune, Everett Tribune, Marysville Globe, and The Monroe Monitor serve their respective communities.

The county is part of the Seattle broadcast television market and is served by several regional television news stations, including KOMO, KING, KIRO, KCTS, and KCPQ.

Local radio stations based in the county include KKXA, KRKO, KSER, and KWYZ.

There are also smaller local publications, with significant online presences: The Monroe Monitor, My Edmonds News, Edmonds Beacon, My Everett News, The Mountlake Terrace News, News of Mill Creek, The Mukilteo Beacon, The Snohomish County Reporter, and The Snohomish Times.

Transportation

Roads
Snohomish County has five major routes that connect the county to the other counties and other areas. There are three major north–south routes: Interstate 5, State Route 9, and State Route 99. The only complete east–west route is U.S. Route 2.

 Interstate 5
 Interstate 405
 U.S. Route 2
 State Route 9
 State Route 92
 State Route 96
 State Route 99
 State Route 104
 State Route 203
 State Route 204
 State Route 522
 State Route 524
 State Route 525
 State Route 526
 State Route 527
 State Route 528
 State Route 529
 State Route 530
 State Route 531
 State Route 532

Public transportation
Snohomish County is served by three public transit systems: Community Transit, which provides local service within the county (apart from the city of Everett) and commuter service to the Boeing Everett Factory, Downtown Seattle and the University of Washington campus; Everett Transit, a municipal system serving the city of Everett; and Sound Transit, which provides commuter rail service and express bus service connecting to regional destinations in Seattle and Bellevue. Sound Transit runs four daily Sounder commuter trains at peak hours between Everett Station and Seattle, stopping at Mukilteo and Edmonds.

Intercity rail service is provided by Amtrak, which has two lines operating within Snohomish County: Amtrak Cascades between Seattle and Vancouver, British Columbia, stopping in Edmonds, Everett, and Stanwood station; and the Empire Builder between Seattle and Chicago, Illinois, stopping in Edmonds and Everett. Intercity bus service is provided by Greyhound Lines and Northwestern Trailways from Everett Station.

Community Transit also operates a bus rapid transit service called Swift from Everett Station to the Aurora Village in Shoreline along the State Route 99 corridor, which opened in 2009; the service is anticipated to be expanded in 2018, with a new line serving the Airport Road and State Route 527 corridors, from the Boeing Everett Factory to Bothell via Mill Creek. Sound Transit is also planning to extend Link light rail service from Northgate to Lynnwood in 2024, having won voter approval for the project in 2008. An additional extension to Everett, not yet approved by voters, has been proposed as part of a regional transit package.  Island Transit also operates bus links through Snohomish County from Everett and Skagit County's Mount Vernon to Camano Island because the island does not have direct road access to its county-seat island, Whidbey Island.

Airports
Snohomish County has one major airport: Paine Field, otherwise known as Snohomish County Airport, which has had passenger service since March 2019.

There are three smaller public airports that are open to general aviation: Arlington Municipal Airport in Arlington, Darrington Municipal Airport in Darrington, and Harvey Field in Snohomish. The county also has several private airports, including the Frontier Airpark and Green Valley Airfield in Granite Falls. The Martha Lake Airport in Martha Lake was a former private airport that was closed in 2000 and was converted into a county park that opened in 2010.

Ferries
Snohomish County is also connected to adjacent counties by two ferry routes operated by Washington State Ferries. The Edmonds–Kingston ferry carries SR 104 between Edmonds and Kingston in Kitsap County. The Mukilteo–Clinton ferry carries SR 525 from Mukilteo to Clinton on Whidbey Island.

Communities

Cities

 Arlington
 Bothell (partly in King County)
 Brier
 Edmonds
 Everett (county seat)
 Gold Bar
 Granite Falls
 Lake Stevens
 Lynnwood
 Marysville
 Mill Creek
 Monroe
 Mountlake Terrace
 Mukilteo
 Snohomish
 Stanwood
 Sultan
 Woodway

Towns
 Darrington
 Index

Census-designated places

Alderwood Manor
Arlington Heights
Bothell East
Bothell West
Bryant
Bunk Foss
Canyon Creek
Cathcart
Cavalero
Chain Lake
Clearview
Eastmont
Esperance
Fobes Hill
Hat Island
High Bridge
Kayak Point
Lake Bosworth
Lake Cassidy
Lake Goodwin
Lake Ketchum
Lake Roesiger
Lake Stickney
Larch Way
Lochsloy
Machias
Maltby
Martha Lake
May Creek
Meadowdale
Mill Creek East
Monroe North
North Lynnwood
North Marysville
North Sultan
Northwest Stanwood
Oso
Perrinville
Picnic Point
Silvana
Silver Firs
Sisco Heights
Startup
Sunday Lake
Swede Heaven
Three Lakes
Verlot
Warm Beach
Woods Creek

Unincorporated communities

Florence
Fortson
Galena
Getchell
Hazel
Reiter
Robe
Silverton
Sisco
Smokey Point
Trafton
Tulalip Indian Reservation

See also
Isaac Cathcart
National Register of Historic Places listings in Snohomish County, Washington
Robe Canyon Historic Trail

References

Further reading
 Jonathan Stuart Burr, Organized Labor's Influence on Local Elections: A Case History of Snohomish County, Washington. Master's thesis. Columbus State University, 2005.
 An Illustrated History of Skagit and Snohomish Counties, Washington, Their People, Their Commerce and Their Resources: With an Outline of the Early History of the State of Washington. Chicago: Interstate Publishing Co., 1906.
 Journal of Everett & Snohomish County History, Everett Public Library, 1981-

External links

Official Snohomish County website
Snohomish County Tourism Bureau

Archives
University of Washington Libraries Digital Collections – Lee Pickett Photographs
 Snohomish County Central Labor Council records. 1915–1999. Approximately 25 cubic feet. At the Labor Archives of Washington, University of Washington Libraries Special Collections.

 
Seattle metropolitan area
1861 establishments in Washington Territory
Populated places established in 1861
Western Washington
Washington placenames of Native American origin